Gerald Cleaver (born May 4, 1963) is a jazz drummer from Detroit, Michigan.

Early life
Cleaver's father is drummer John Cleaver Jr., originally from Springfield, Ohio, and his mother was from Greenwood, Mississippi. Gerald had six older siblings.

Career
Cleaver joined the jazz faculty at the University of Michigan in 1995. He has performed or recorded with Joe Morris, Mat Maneri, Roscoe Mitchell, Miroslav Vitouš, Michael Formanek, Tomasz Stańko, Franck Amsallem and others.

Under the name Veil of Names, Cleaver released an album called Adjust on the  Fresh Sound New Talent label in 2001. It featured Maneri, Ben Monder, Andrew Bishop, Craig Taborn and Reid Anderson and was a Best Debut Recording Nominee by the Jazz Journalists Association.

Cleaver currently leads the groups Uncle June, Black Host, Violet Hour and NiMbNl as well as working as a sideman with many different artists.

Discography
An asterisk (*) indicates that the year is that of release.

As leader/co-leader

As sideman
With Lotte Anker
 Triptych (Leo, 2005)
 Live at the Loft (ILK, 2009)
 Floating Islands (ILK, 2009)

With Samuel Blaser
 7th Heaven (Between the Lines, 2008)
 Boundless (Hatology, 2011) with Marc Ducret
 As the Sea (Hatology, 2012) with Marc Ducret
 Spring Rain (Whirlwind, 2015)

With Ellery Eskelin
 Trio Willisau Live (HatOLOGY 2016)
 Trio New York II (Prime source 2013)
 Trio New York (Prime source 2011)

With Chris Lightcap
 Lay-up (Fresh Sound, 2000)
 Bigmouth(Fresh Sound, 2003)
 Deluxe (Clean Feed, 2010)
 Epicenter (Clean Feed, 2015)
 SuperBigmouth (Pyroclastic, 2019)

With Roscoe Mitchell
 The Day and the Night  (Dizim, 1997)
 Nine to Get Ready (ECM, 1999)
 Song for My Sister (Pi, 2002)

With Joe Morris
 Underthru (OmniTone, 1999)
 At the Old Office (Knitting Factory, 2000)
 Altitude (AUM Fidelity, 2012)
 Balance (Clean Feed, 2014)

With Ivo Perelman
 Family Ties (Leo, 2012) with Joe Morris
 The Living Jelly (Leo, 2012) with Joe Morris
 The Foreign Legion (Leo, 2012) with Matthew Shipp
 Enigma (Leo, 2013) with Matthew Shipp and Whit Dickey
 Serendipity (Leo, 2013) with Matthew Shipp and William Parker
 The Art of The Improv Trio Volume 1 (Leo, 2016) with Karl Berger
 The Art of The Improv Trio Volume 3 (Leo, 2016) with Matthew Shipp
 The Art of The Improv Trio Volume 4 (Leo, 2016) with William Parker
 The Art of The Improv Trio Volume 5 (Leo, 2016) with Joe Morris
 The Art of The Improv Trio Volume 6 (Leo, 2016) with Joe Morris
 Breaking Point (Leo, 2016) with Mat Maneri and Joe Morris
 Octagon (Leo, 2017) with Brandon Lopez and Nate Wooley

With Matthew Shipp
 Pastoral Composure (Thirsty Ear, 2000)
 New Orbit (Thirsty Ear, 2001)
 The Blue Series Continuum – Sorcerer Sessions (Thirsty Ear, 2003)
 Equilibrium (Thirsty Ear, 2003)
 Harmony and Abyss (Thirsty Ear, 2004)
 Our Lady of the Flowers (RogueArt, 2015)

With Miroslav Vitous
 Universal Syncopations II (ECM, 2007)
 Remembering Weather Report (ECM, 2009)
 Music of Weather Report (ECM, 2016)

With others
 Andrew Bishop, Time & Imaginary Time (Envoi, 2006)
 Rob Brown, Crown Trunk Root Funk (AUM Fidelity, 2008)
 Rob Brown, Unexplained Phenomena (Marge, 2011)
 Taylor Ho Bynum, Book of Three (RogueArt, 2010)
 Taylor Ho Bynum, Book of Three – Continuum (Relative Pitch, 2013)
 Benoit Delbecq, Spots on Stripes (Clean Feed, 2018)
 Yelena Eckemoff, In the Shadow of a Cloud (L&H, 2017)
 Liberty Ellman, Ophiuchus Butterfly (Pi, 2006)
 Michael Formanek,  The Rub and Spare Change (ECM, 2010) with Tim Berne & Craig Taborn
 Michael Formanek, Small Places (ECM, 2012) with Tim Berne & Craig Taborn
 Charles Gayle, Precious Soul (FMP, 2001)
 Charles Gayle, Shout! (Clean Feed, 2005)
 Daniel Guggenheim, Traces of... (Laika, 2005)
 Frank London, Hazonos (Tzadik, 2005)
 Mat Maneri, Blue Decco (Thirsty Ear, 2000)
 Mat Maneri, Sustain (Thirsty Ear, 2002) with Joe McPhee
 Jemeel Moondoc, Live at the Vision Festival (Ayler, 2003)
 Angelika Niescier, New York Trio (Intakt, 2019)
 Fredrik Nordstrom, Gentle Fire, Restless Dreams (Moserobie, 2016)
 Eivind Opsvik, Overseas (Fresh Sound, 2002)
 William Parker, Double Sunrise Over Neptune (AUM Fidelity, 2007)
 William  Parker, Uncle Joe's Spirit House (Centering, 2010)
 Mario Pavone, Orange (Playscape, 2003)
 Mario Pavone, Ancestors (Playscape, 2008)
 Jeremy Pelt, November (MAXJAZZ, 2008)
 Jeremy Pelt, Men of Honor (HighNote, 2010)
 Jeremy Pelt, The Talented Mr. Pelt (HighNote, 2011)
 Jeremy Pelt, Soul (HighNote, 2012)
 Eric Revis, Crowded Solitudes (Clean Feed, 2016)
 Samo Salamon, Government Cheese (Fresh Sound New Talent, 2006)
 Samo Salamon, Stretching Out (Samo Records, 2012)
 Wadada Leo Smith, Lake Biwa (Tzadik, 2004)
 Tomasz Stanko, Wislawa (ECM, 2013)
 Tomasz Stanko, December Avenue (ECM, 2017)
 Steve Swell, Soul Travelers (Roguert, 2016)
 Adam Rogers and Dave Binney, R&B (Criss Cross, 2015)
 Craig Taborn, Light Made Lighter (Thirsty Ear, 2001)
 Craig Taborn, Chants (ECM, 2013)
 Gebhard Ullmann, Hat and Shoes (Between the Lines, 2015)
 Rodney Whitaker, Hidden Kingdom (DIW, 1997)

References

Northern Spy Records artists
1963 births
Living people
Musicians from Detroit
American jazz drummers
University of Michigan faculty
20th-century American drummers
American male drummers
Jazz musicians from Michigan
20th-century American male musicians
American male jazz musicians
AUM Fidelity artists
RogueArt artists
NoBusiness Records artists